Kyō no Go no Ni, the debut manga of Koharu Sakuraba, has been adapted into an OVA and an anime and has been adapted into another OVA in 2009. In 2006, Shinkūkan animated the OVA that was directed by Makoto Sokuza. Each episode of the OVA is presented in five distinct chapters except for the special. In 2008, the manga was readapted into an anime that was animated by Xebec, produced by Starchild Records, directed by Tsuyoshi Nagasawa, and written by Takamitsu Kouno. Each episode of the anime is presented in four distinct chapters except for the thirteenth episode. In April 2009, Kodansha announced that Xebec will produce an OVA adaptation of Kyō no Go no Ni, directed again by Tsuyoshi Nagasawa and written by Takamitsu Kouno. The plot focuses around everyday life of students of class 5-2 and more specifically around Ryōta and his group of friends over the course of their fifth grade.

A special audio track was included in the DVDs in which the female characters' voices are replaced by members of the idol unit Sweet Kiss; Chika's voice actor (Mai Kadowaki) is replaced by Saaya Irie; Yūki's voice actor (Mikako Takahashi) is replaced by Jessica; Kazumi Aihara's voice actor (Noto Mamiko) is replaced by Runa. Each DVD also has a special edit version that comes with an extra item or two. The DVD boxset was released on January 30, 2008. It included all four of the OVA adaptation's DVDs, an additional DVD entitled  that included the extra chapter as well as an interview with the staff, and an additional CD which included: all three of the theme songs, all the tracks on the radio drama included with the special edit of the third OVA DVD volume, and a special wallpaper for a computer. The first OVA features one opening and two ending themes: "Baby Love" is used as the opening for all the episodes; "Yakusoku" is used as the first ending theme for the first two episodes; and "Sakura Iro Kaze" is used as the second ending theme for the last two episodes. In an interview, Mai Kadowaki said that "Sakura Iro Kaze" is the graduation song for class 5–2.

The anime ran from October 5, 2008, to December 28, 2008, on Tokyo Broadcasting System in Japan. The anime adaptation featured six main theme songs, one opening that was also used as an ending theme, and five different ending themes. "Nisemono" is used as the opening theme for all the episodes except the last which does not feature an opening theme. "secret base ~Kimi ga Kureta Mono~" is used as the first ending theme from episodes one through three. "Daibakuhatsu NO.1" is used as the second ending theme for episodes four and five. "Natsu Matsuri" is used as the third ending theme for episode six. "Yūyake Iro" is used as the third ending theme from episode seven to episode nine. "Negai" is used as the fifth ending theme from episode ten to episode twelve. Four DVDs were released from December 25, 2008, to March 25, 2009, each containing three episodes except for the last which contains four. Each DVD is assigned a season in chronological order beginning from spring.

OVA

Anime

References

External links
OVA Episode List 
Anime Episode List 

Kyo no Go no Ni